Guldens is an unincorporated community in Straban Township, Adams County, Pennsylvania, United States. It is located off  U.S. Route 30, approximately five miles east of Gettysburg.

References

Unincorporated communities in Pennsylvania